Jaime Marquet (born Jacques Marquet, in París, 1710–1782) was a French architect who worked extensively in Bourbon Spain, and whose most important work includes the central plaza of Madrid  known as Puerta del Sol and the adjacent monumental building, the Real Casa de Correos or Royal Mail Headquarters, now the offices of the President of the Community of Madrid.

Biography 
In the 1750s he was commissioned by Fernando de Silva, 12th Duke of Alba, who was then ambassador of Spain in Paris, to build a new palace in the family seat at Piedrahíta which occurred between 1755 and 1766.

The Duke of Alba introduced him to the court of Ferdinand VI after which he was commissioned to refurbish the cobblestones of the city of Madrid. In 1755 he entered the Real Academia de Bellas Artes de San Fernando. Between 1756 and 1760, while starting his career in the Spanish capital, King Ferdinand VI commissioned the architect Ventura Rodriguez to lead the demolition of the city blocks 205 and 206 that bordered the Puerta del Sol, and to construct a headquarters building for the Spanish postal service Correos.

In 1759, Fernando VI died, but  the predilection for the French taste of the Bourbon court continued to flourish under his successor, King Carlos III, who had disagreements about style with Ventura Rodríguez. These two decisive events led to the appointment of Jaime Marquet, who took over responsibility for the design of the Puerta del Sol project in 1760 and undertook construction of the site which occurred between 1766 and 1768.

As well as the Palacio Alba in Piedrahita, Puerta de Sol and the Real Casa de Correos in Madrid Jaime Marquet was also responsible for:
 Iglesia de San Antonio (Royal church, Aranjuez, c. 1752) 
 Cocheras de la Reina Madre, Aranjuez, Madrid (1758)
 Los Cuarteles de las Reales Guardias Españolas y Walonas, Aranjuez (1770–72)
 Teatro Real Coliseo de Carlos III de Aranjuez, (1767)  (the first enclosed theatre built in Spain) 
 Teatro Real Coliseo de Carlos III, San Lorenzo de El Escorial, Madrid (1771–72)

References

Literature
 

1710 births
1782 deaths
18th-century French architects
Architects from Paris
French neoclassical architects
French emigrants to Spain
Spanish architects